Prince Edward Island is one of Canada's provinces, and has established several provincial symbols.

Symbols

References 

Prince Edward Island
Symbols
Canadian provincial and territorial symbols